Nationality words link to articles with information on the nation's poetry or literature (for instance, Irish or France).

Events
The Forward Prizes for Poetry in the U.K. are initiated and The Forward Book of Poetry, an associated annual anthology of best British poems, is published for the first time by the Forward Poetry Trust. By 2003, the publication is selling 5,000 to 7,000 copies a year. Each year, 50 to 80 poems are selected.
The first wall poems in Leiden are installed.

Works published in English
Listed by nation where the work was first published and again by the poet's native land, if different; substantially revised works listed separately:

Australia
 Chris Mansell, Shining Like a Jinx
 Les Murray, Translations from the Natural World, winner of the 1993 Kenneth Slessor Prize for Poetry
 A. B. Paterson, A. B. Paterson, Selected Poems, edited by Les Murray, Collins/Angus & Robertson, 1992, 1996, posthumous

Canada
 Elisabeth Harvor, Fortress of Chairs, winner of the Gerald Lampert Award
 Irving Layton, Fornalutx: Selected Poems, 1928-1990. Montreal: McGill-Queen's University Press.
 George Woodcock, George Woodcock's Introduction to Canadian Poetry, Toronto: ECW Press

India, in English
 Jayanta Mahapatra, A Whiteness of Bone ( Poetry in English ), New Delhi: Penguin Books
 Rukmini Bhaya Nair, The Hyoid Bone ( Poetry in English ), New Delhi: Penguin
 Jeet Thayil and Vijay Nambisan, Gemini-2 ( Poetry in English ), New Delhi: Penguin-Viking
 Arvind Krishna Mehrotra, editor, Oxford India Anthology of Twelve Modern Indian Poets, Arundhathi Subramaniam has called the volume a significant and influential work in Indian poetry
 Ranjit Hoskote and Mangesh Kulkarni, translators, A Terrorist of the Spirit, translation of Vasant Abaji Dahake's Yogabhrashta from the original Marathi into English; New Delhi: Harper Collins/Indus

Ireland
 Harry Clifton, The Desert Route, Oldcastle: The Gallery Press, 
 Seán Dunne, The Sheltered Nest, including "Sydney Place", Oldcastle: The Gallery Press, 
 Peter Fallon, Eye to Eye, Oldcastle: The Gallery Press,

New Zealand
 Fleur Adcock (New Zealand poet who moved to England in 1963), translation of Letters from Darkness: Poems, by Daniela Crasnaru, Oxford: Oxford University Press
 Alistair Campbell, Stone Rain: The Polynesian Strain, Auckland: Hazard Press

United Kingdom
 Fleur Adcock (New Zealand poet who moved to England in 1963), translation of Letters from Darkness: Poems, by Daniela Crasnaru, Oxford: Oxford University Press
 Simon Armitage:
 Kid
 Xanadu
 George Mackay Brown:
 Brodgar Poems
 The Lost Village
 Stewart Brown, Caribbean Poetry Now (2nd revised edition), London: Edward Arnold (anthology)
 Wendy Cope, Serious Concerns
 Carol Ann Duffy:
 William and the Ex-Prime Minister, Anvil Press Poetry, a 16-page pamphlet, 
 Editor, I Wouldn't Thank You for a Valentine, Viking (anthology)
 Douglas Dunn, editor, Faber Book of Twentieth-Century Scottish Poetry, London: Faber and Faber (anthology)
 Gavin Ewart, Like It Or Not
 U. A. Fanthorpe, Neck-Verse
 Thom Gunn:
 The Man With Night Sweats
 Old Stories
 Tony Harrison, The Gaze of the Gorgon
 Seamus Heaney:
 The Golden Bough, Bonnefant Press
 Sweeney's Flight (with Rachel Giese, photographer), Faber & Faber
 Adrian Henri, The Cerise Swimsuit
 Ted Hughes, Rain-Charm for the Duchy
 Elizabeth Jennings, Times and Seasons
 P. J. Kavanagh, Collected Poems
 James Kirkup, Shooting Stars
 Derek Mahon, The Yaddo Letter, Gallery Press
 George MacBeth, The Patient
 Roger McGough, Defying Gravity
 David Owen, editor, Seven Ages: poetry for a lifetime, anthology
 Peter Porter, The Chair of Babel
 Kathleen Raine, Living With Mystery
 Peter Reading:
 Evagatory
 3 in 1
 Peter Redgrove, Under the Reservoir
 Jeremy Reed, Black Sugar, illustrated by Jean Cocteau
 William Scammell, Bleeding Heart Yard
 Jo Shapcott, Phrase Book
 Penelope Shuttle, Taxing the Rain
 Jon Silkin, The Lens-Breakers
 David Storey, Storey's Lives: 1951-1991
 R.S. Thomas, Mass for Hard Times
 Charles Tomlinson, The Door in the Wall
 Benjamin Zephaniah, City Psalms

United States
 Sherman Alexie, The Business of Fancy Dancing
 John Ashbery, Hotel Lautréamont
 Renée Ashley, Salt
 Jack Gilbert, The Great Fires
 Anthony Kellman, editor, Crossing Water: Contemporary Poetry of the English-Speaking Caribbean, Greenfield Center, New York: Greenfield Review Press (anthology)
 Zoe Leonard, I want a president
 N. Scott Momaday, In the Presence of the Sun, combination of poetry and nonfiction
 Mary Oliver, New and Selected Poems
 Simon Ortiz, Woven Stone, combination of poetry and nonfiction
 Grace Paley, New and Collected Poems
 Carl Phillips, In the Blood
 Gjertrud Schnackenberg, A Gilded Lapse of Time
 Lloyd Schwartz, Goodnight, Gracie 
 Patti Smith, Woolgathering
 James Wright, Above the River: Complete Poems, introduction by Donald Hall (posthumous)

Poets included in The Best American Poetry 1992
These 75 poets are included in The Best American Poetry 1992 edited by David Lehman, with guest editor Charles Simic:

Jonathan Aaron
Agha Shahid Ali
John Ash
John Ashbery
Robin Behn
Charles Bernstein
George Bilgere
Elizabeth Bishop
Robert Bly
Lucie Brock-Broido
Joseph Brodsky
Hayden Carruth
Billy Collins
Robert Creeley
Kathleen de Azevedo

Carl Dennis
Deborah Digges
Stephen Dunn
Susan Firer
Alice Fulton
Tess Gallagher
Amy Gerstler
Jack Gilbert
Louise Glück
Jill Gonet
Jorie Graham
Allen Grossman
Marilyn Hacker
Donald Hall
Daniel Halpern

Robert Hass
Vickie Hearne
Juan Felipe Herrera
Edward Hirsch
Daniel Hoffman
John Hollander
Richard Howard
Lynda Hull
Lawrence Joseph
Galway Kinnell
Carolyn Kizer
Phyllis Koestenbaum
Sharon Krinsky
Maxine Kumin
Evelyn Lao

Li-Young Lee
Dionisio D. Martínez
Mekeel McBride
James McCorkle
Jerry McGuire
Sandra McPherson
Robert Morgan
Thylias Moss
Carol Muske
Mary Oliver
Michael Palmer
Robert Pinsky
Lawrence Raab
Liam Rector
Donald Revell

Adrienne Rich
Len Roberts
Lynda Schraufnagel
Elizabeth Spires
Rachel Srubas
David St. John
Richard Tillinghast
Lewis Turco
Chase Twichell
Rosanna Warren
Ioanna-Veronika Warwick
C. K. Williams
Charles Wright
Franz Wright
Stephen Yenser

Other
 Nuala Ní Dhomhnaill, The Astrakhan Cloak, including "Caitlin", Oldcastle: The Gallery Press

Works published in other languages
Listed by nation where the work was first published and again by the poet's native land, if different; substantially revised works listed separately:

Danish
 Naja Marie Aidt, Et Vanskeligt mode ("A Difficult Encounter"), second volume of a poetic trilogy which started with Sålænge jeg er ung ("As Long as I’m Young") 1991, and ended with Det tredje landskap ("The Third Landscape") 1994

French language

Canada, in French
 Denise Desautels, Le saut de l'ange, autour de quelques objets de Martha Townsend, Montréal/Amay, Le Noroît /L'Arbre à paroles
 Jean Royer, Le lien de la terre, Trois-Rivières: Écrits des Forges / Paris: Europe poésie

France
 Olivier Barbarant,  Les parquets du ciel, publisher: Editions Champ Vallon, 
 Michel Houellebecq, La Poursuite du bonheur, poèmes, La Différence
 Abdellatif Laabi, Moroccan author writing in French and published in France:
 Le soleil se meurt; Paris: La Différence
 translator, La Joie n'est pas mon métier, translated from the original Arabic of Mohammed Al-Maghout; Paris: Éditions de la Différence, coll. Orphée

Hungary
 György Petri, Sár
 Sándor Tóth, Belül ragyoghatsz

India
Listed in alphabetical order by first name:
 Chandrakant Shah, also known as Chandu Shah, Ane Thoda Sapna ("And Some Dreams"), received the award for "Best Collection of New Gujarati Poems" published in 1992-1993 by the Gujarati Sahitya Parishad; Mumbai: SNDT University; Gujarati-language
 Dilip Chitre, Ekoon Kavita – 1, Mumbai: Popular Prakashan; Marathi-language
 K. Satchidanandan, Kavibuddhan, ("The Poet as Buddha"); Malayalam-language
 Mamta Sagar, Kaada Navilina Hejje, Heggodu: Akshara Prakashana, Kannada-language
 Vinod Kumar Shukla, Sab Kuch Hona Bacha Rahega, New Delhi: Rajkamal Prakashan; Hindi-language

Poland
 Stanisław Barańczak, Ocalone w tlumaczeniu. Szkice o warsztacie tlumaczenia poezji ("Saved in Translation: Sketches on the Craft of Translating Poetry"), criticism; Poznan: a5
 Zbigniew Herbert, Rovigo, Wrocław: Wydawnictwo Dolnośląskie
 Eugeniusz Tkaczyszyn-Dycki, Peregrynarz
 Tadeusz Różewicz, Nasz starszy brat ("Our Elder Brother")
 Wisława Szymborska: Lektury nadobowiązkowe ("Non-required Reading")
 Adam Zagajewski, Dzikie czeresnie, wybór wierszy ("Wild Cherries, a Selection of Poetry"), Kraków: Znak

Other languages
 Han Dong, Baise de shitou ("The White Stone"), Shanghai: wenyi chubanshe China
 Gabriela Mistral, Lagar II, published posthumously, Santiago, Chile: Biblioteca Nacional
 Maria Luisa Spaziani, Torri di vedata, Italy

Awards and honors
 Nobel prize: Derek Walcott

Australia
 C. J. Dennis Prize for Poetry: Robert Harris, Jane, Interlinear and Other Poems
 Kenneth Slessor Prize for Poetry: Elizabeth Riddell, Selected Poems
 Mary Gilmore Prize: Alison Croggon - This is the Stone

Canada
 Gerald Lampert Award: Joanne Arnott, Wiles of Girlhood
 Archibald Lampman Award: Blaine Marchand, A Garden Enclosed
 1992 Governor General's Awards: Lorna Crozier, Inventing the Hawk (English); Gilles Cyr, Andromède attendra
 Pat Lowther Award: Kate Braid, Covering Rough Ground
 Prix Alain-Grandbois: Monique Bosco, Miserere
 Dorothy Livesay Poetry Prize: Barry McKinnon, Pulplog
 Prix Émile-Nelligan: Serge Patrice Thibodeau, Le Cycle de Prague

United Kingdom
 Cholmondeley Award: Allen Curnow, Donald Davie, Carol Ann Duffy, Roger Woddis
 Eric Gregory Award: Jill Dawson, Hugh Dunkerley, Christopher Greenhalgh, Marita Maddah, Stuart Paterson, Stuart Pickford
 Forward Poetry Prize Best Collection: Thom Gunn, The Man with Night Sweats (Faber and Faber)
 Forward Poetry Prize Best First Collection:  Simon Armitage, Kid (Faber and Faber)
 Queen's Gold Medal for Poetry: Kathleen Raine
 Whitbread Award for poetry: Tony Harrison, The Gaze of the Gorgon

United States
 Agnes Lynch Starrett Poetry Prize: Hunt Hawkins, The Domestic Life
 Aiken Taylor Award for Modern American Poetry: Gwendolyn Brooks
 AML Award for poetry to Kathy Evans for "Wednesday Morning"; "Midweek"; "Eight Windows"; "Vows"; "Love to the Second Power"
 Bernard F. Connors Prize for Poetry: Tony Sanders, "The Warning Track"
 Bobbitt National Prize for Poetry: Louise Glück for Ararat, and Mark Strand for The Continuous Life
 Frost Medal: Adrienne Rich / David Ignatow
 National Book Award for poetry: Mary Oliver, New & Selected Poems
 Poet Laureate Consultant in Poetry to the Library of Congress: Mona Van Duyn
 Pulitzer Prize for Poetry: James Tate, Selected Poems
 Ruth Lilly Poetry Prize: John Ashbery
 Whiting Awards: Roger Fanning, Jane Mead, Katha Pollitt
 William Carlos Williams Award: Louise Glück, The Wild Iris
 Fellowship of the Academy of American Poets: Adrienne Rich

Births
 October 5 – Rupi Kaur, Indian-born Canadian poet and illustrator

Deaths
Birth years link to the corresponding "[year] in poetry" article:
 February 16
 Angela Carter, 51 (born 1940), English novelist and poet, of lung cancer
 George MacBeth, 60 (born 1932), Scottish-born poet, novelist and critic, of motor neuron disease
 February 18 – Robert Gittings, 81 (born 1911), English poet and biographer
 February 29 – Ruth Pitter, 94 (born 1897), English poet and decorative painter
 April 11 – Eve Merriam, née Moskowitz, 75 (born 1916), American poet, playwright and teacher, of cancer
 May 12 – Nikos Gatsos, 80 (born 1911), Greek poet, translator and lyricist
 May 21 – Bimbo Rivas, 52 (born 1939), Puerto Rican-born American actor, community activist, director, playwright, poet and teacher, of heart attack
 November 17 – Audre Lorde (aka Gamba Adisa), 58 (born 1934), African American writer, poet and political activist, of liver cancer
 November 19 – Kenneth Burke, 96 (born 1897), American literary theorist and philosopher

See also

Poetry
List of years in poetry
List of poetry awards

References

20th-century poetry
Poetry